Dimitri Joukovski is a Canadian sprint canoer who competed in the early to mid-2000s. He won three silver medals in the C-4 1000 m event at the ICF Canoe Sprint World Championships earning them in 2002, 2003, and 2006.

References

Canadian male canoeists
Living people
Year of birth missing (living people)
ICF Canoe Sprint World Championships medalists in Canadian